Sprattsville is an unincorporated community in Mingo County, West Virginia, United States.

References 

Unincorporated communities in West Virginia
Unincorporated communities in Mingo County, West Virginia
Populated places on the Guyandotte River